Tillandsia incarnata is a species of flowering plant in the genus Tillandsia. This species is native to Venezuela and Ecuador.

References

incarnata
Flora of Venezuela
Flora of Ecuador